Peter Kox (born 23 February 1964 in Eindhoven) is a racing driver from the Netherlands.

Kox began racing in karts in 1978, winning five titles until 1982. In 1983 he moved to automobiles, winning the Marlboro Formula Ford Challenge and was second and third in the Benelux and Dutch Formula Ford 2000 Championships, respectively, the following year. His single-seater racing career was interrupted several times and only took off in 1989 when he won the Benelux Formula Opel Championship in 1989.

In 1990 Kox raced in the British Formula 3 Championship where he came third with two victories. He moved up to Formula 3000 in 1991, staying there for two seasons and winning one race.

Unable to find a seat in Formula One, Kox moved to touring cars driving a BMW, winning five races in the Dutch series in 1993 on his way to the championship title. In 1995 he became a works BMW driver in the German Supertouring Championship, coming second in the series, and also winning the Spa 24 Hours. In 1996 he joined the BMW Motorsport, making a handful of British Touring Car Championship appearances but focusing his efforts on the development program for the McLaren F1 GTR, winning a race in the BPR Global GT Series. The following year he drove the car in the FIA GT Championship, winning once more. He also took a class win in the Spa 24 Hours with a Diesel-powered BMW.

From 1998 to 2000 Kox returned to touring cars, becoming a Honda works driver. He raced full-time in the BTCC in 1998 and 1999 (coming 7th overall in 1999), before taking second place in the Euro STC in 2000. The following year he joined the Carly Motors squad in a BMW and also took a win in a one-off race in the FIA GT Championship, with the Prodrive Ferrari 550 Maranello.

Kox continued with Prodrive for the following seasons, winning the GTS class in the Laguna Seca ALMS race in 2002 and the 2003 24 Hours of Le Mans. In 2004 and 2005 he raced for several different teams, including Prodrive (in the Ferrari and Aston Martin DBR9) and Reiter Engineering (in the Lamborghini Murcielago). In 2006 he split his time between the MenX team, Aston Martin and Spyker, in FIA GT, Le Mans, Le Mans Series and ALMS.

In 2007 and 2008 Peter Kox is a works driver for Lamborghini, driving in the FIA GT Championship and ADAC GT Masters. He took part in the 24 Hours of Le Mans in 2007 with the works Aston Martin and 2008 with IPB Spartak Lamborghini.

Peter Kox was a development driver for the Acura NSX GT3 in 2016, and will drive it in the 2017 Pirelli World Challenge for RealTime Racing.

His daughter Stéphane Kox is also a racing driver.

Racing record

Complete International Formula 3000 results
(key) (Races in bold indicate pole position; races in italics indicate fastest lap.)

24 Hours of Le Mans results

Complete Super Tourenwagen Cup results
(key) (Races in bold indicate pole position) (Races in italics indicate fastest lap)

Complete Japanese Touring Car Championship results
(key) (Races in bold indicate pole position) (Races in italics indicate fastest lap)

Complete British Touring Car Championship results
(key) (Races in bold indicate pole position – 1 point awarded all races) (Races in italics indicate fastest lap) (* signifies that driver lead feature race for at least one lap – 1 point given 1998 onwards)

Complete European Touring Car Championship results
(key) (Races in bold indicate pole position) (Races in italics indicate fastest lap)

Complete European Super Production Championship results
(key) (Races in bold indicate pole position) (Races in italics indicate fastest lap)

V8 Supercar results

† Not Eligible for points

FIA GT competition results

Complete FIA GT Championship results
(key) (Races in bold indicate pole position; races in italics indicate fastest lap.)

† Not eligible for points

Complete GT1 World Championship results
(key) (Races in bold indicate pole position; races in italics indicate fastest lap.)

Complete FIA GT Series results
(key) (Races in bold indicate pole position; races in italics indicate fastest lap.)

Complete Blancpain Sprint Series results
(key) (Races in bold indicate pole position; races in italics indicate fastest lap.)

External links
 
 
 

1964 births
Living people
Sportspeople from Eindhoven
Dutch racing drivers
FIA GT Championship drivers
24 Hours of Le Mans drivers
British Touring Car Championship drivers
International Formula 3000 drivers
British Formula 3000 Championship drivers
American Le Mans Series drivers
European Le Mans Series drivers
FIA GT1 World Championship drivers
Supercars Championship drivers
Blancpain Endurance Series drivers
International GT Open drivers
ADAC GT Masters drivers
Sports car racing team owners
24 Hours of Spa drivers
European Touring Car Championship drivers
24H Series drivers
British GT Championship drivers
West Competition drivers
David Price Racing drivers
Aston Martin Racing drivers
Dick Johnson Racing drivers
Schnitzer Motorsport drivers
BMW M drivers
CRS Racing drivers
W Racing Team drivers
Nürburgring 24 Hours drivers
Porsche Motorsports drivers
Le Mans Cup drivers